is a Japanese novel written by Ryō Asai, first published on October 5, 2010, by Shueisha. It follows the members of a university's all-male cheerleading squad. The novel is loosely based on the real-life men's cheerleading team "Shockers" from Waseda University. The series was also adapted as a manga by Kenichi Kondō for the Shōnen Jump+ app starting on April 5, 2016. An anime adaptation started airing on July 5, 2016. It is directed by Ai Yoshimura and written by Reiko Yoshida for the studio Brain's Base. A live action film directed by Hiroki Kazama is slated to open in early 2019.

Plot
Disheartened with judo, college student Haruki "Haru" Bando was invited by his childhood boyfriend Kazuma Hashimoto to create "BREAKERS", an unprecedented boys' cheerleading team. Those that came to join all were very characteristic in nature: argumentative Mizoguchi, voracious Ton, frivolous Kansai boys Gen and Ichiro, and Sho, who has cheerleading experience.

Characters

Haruki is the protagonist. He was previously a part of the judo club before he was convinced to join the cheerleading team, Breakers, by his childhood friend, Kazuma.

Haruki's childhood friend.

 (Japanese); Seth Magill (English)

 (Japanese); Josh Grelle (English)

 (Japanese); Ricco Fajardo (English)

 (Japanese); Ethan Gallardo (English)

 (Japanese); Jacob Browning (English)

 (Japanese); Kyle Igneczi (English)

Anime 
A 13-episode anime television series produced by Brain's Base aired from July 5, 2016, to September 27, 2016, on KBS Kyoto, Sun TV, and Tokyo MX. The anime is directed by Ai Yoshimura and written by Reiko Yoshida. The opening theme song is "Hajime no Ippo" (初めの一歩|lit Fighting Spirit) by Luck Life and the ending song is "LIMIT BREAKERS" by BREAKERS.

Episode List

References

External links
 Anime official website 

2010 Japanese novels
Brain's Base
Cheerleading television series
Funimation
Shōjo manga
Shōnen manga
Shueisha franchises
Shueisha manga
Sports anime and manga
Sports novels